The 1952 Open Championship was held at the Lansdowne Club in London from 02-7 April. Hashim Khan won his second consecutive title defeating four times champion Mahmoud Karim in the final.

Seeds

Results

+ amateur
^ seeded

References

Men's British Open Squash Championships
Men's British Open Championship
Men's British Open Squash Championship
Men's British Open Squash Championship
Men's British Open Squash Championship
Squash competitions in London